Adama Tamba (born 29 August 1998) is a Gambian footballer who plays as a forward for GFF Women's League Division One club  and the Gambia national team.

Early life 
Adama and her sister  were born in Banjul, and grew up at the SOS Children's Village in Bakoteh, outside of Banjul. The sisters lost their mother at a young age, while their father, a farmer, lived in the hinterlands of the Gambia. Adama began playing football with her male counterparts in primary and high school.

Club career 
In the 2016–17 season, Tamba scored 50 goals in eleven games in the second division, helping  return to the first tier of women's football in the Gambia. In the 2017–18 season, she scored 51 goals in ten games to help Red Scorpions move out of the relegation zone in the first division. As of May 2020, she had 165 goals in 114 league games to her name. Tamba has stated that she is "addicted to scoring goals". Her knack for scoring earned her trials with Paris Saint-Germain and Lyon in 2018.

In September 2021, Tamba signed for Division 2 Féminine club Grenoble on a one-year loan.

International career 
Tamba made her debut for the Gambia U17 national team in a FIFA U-17 Women's World Cup qualifier against Sierra Leone in 2012. She would help the Gambia eventually qualify for the 2012 FIFA U-17 Women's World Cup in Azerbaijan. Tamba played in all three of her nation's matches at the tournament, all of which ended in defeat.

In March 2020, Tamba scored four goals for the Gambia national team in a 5–2 win over Guinea-Bissau in the WAFU Zone A Women's Cup. The Gambia would go on to suffer elimination in the group stage of the competition. As of May 2020, Tamba had eighteen goals in twelve matches for the Scorpions. , coach of the Scorpions, stated that Adama scored in "almost every game", while her sister Awa would "assist most of her goals".

References

External links 
 Grenoble Foot 38 profile

1998 births
Living people
Sportspeople from Banjul
Gambian women's footballers
Women's association football forwards
Grenoble Foot 38 (women) players
The Gambia women's international footballers
Gambian expatriate women's footballers
Gambian expatriate sportspeople in France
Expatriate women's footballers in France